Anna Czerwińska (10 July 1949 – 31 January 2023) was a Polish mountaineer. She is known for being the oldest woman to summit Mount Everest (at the time) at the age of 50. She also published several books about mountaineering.

Climbing career
Czerwińska was born in Warsaw, and was the first Polish woman to reach the Seven Summits. She was D.S. (Pharmacy) but she left medicine science to become a mountain climber, and was later a businesswoman as the owner of a purchasing firm. She climbed for 33 years, usually in all-women teams. In summer 1977 she climbed the North Face of the Matterhorn with Krystyna Palmowska. This was the first time that women had climbed such a difficult wall.

In Winter 1978 she climbed the north face of the Matterhorn with Krystyna Palmowska, Wanda Rutkiewicz, and Irena Kesa Czerwińska. Again they were the first women to succeed and it created a sensation in the European mountaineering world. Czerwińska was a member of the Polish Gasherbrums Expedition in 1975, and in 1979 she climbed a new route, Rakaposhi (7788 m), in Pakistan with Krystyna Palmowska. On 30 June 1983 they both climbed Broad Peak, Rocky Summit - Czerwińska, Main, Snowy Summit 8047 meters - Palmowska). Czerwińska tried to reach the top of K2 in 1982, 1984, and 1986, the last time being a witness to tragedy when 13 climbers died on the mountain. On 15 July 1985, she was on the summit of Nanga Parbat with Wanda Rutkiewicz and Krystyna Palmowska, the first all-woman team to reach the top without the support of men. She tried two times to climb Kanchenjunga, in 1980 and in 1990 as a leader of the expedition.

Czerwińska led the Makalu Expedition in 1988 and was also a member of the Makalu Expedition in the winter of 1990. For five years she “collected” the highest summits of the continents: Aconcagua (South America) and Kilimanjaro (Africa) in 1995, Mount McKinley (North America), Elbrus (Europe) and Mount Kosciuszko (Australia) in 1996, Mount Vinson (Antarctica) in 1998, Carstensz Pyramid (Australia with Oceania) in 1999, and Mount Everest (Asia) on 22 May 2000. On 6 June 2000, she climbed Shishapangma. She authored or coauthored many books about climbing on Matterhorn, Gasherbrum, Broad Peak, Nanga Parbat, and K2. She was, at the time, the oldest woman to summit Mount Everest. On 21 May 2001, Czerwińska summitted Lhotse, then known as Cho Oyu, on 25 September 2001.

Notable mountains climbed
List of eight-thousander mountains climbed:
 1983 - Broad Peak-Rocky Summit (not considered as independent eight-thousander)
 1985 - Nanga Parbat
 1986 - K2 (to the altitude of 8200 m)
 2000 - Mount Everest
 2000 - Shisha Pangma (Central-Peak)
 2001 - Lhotse
 2001 - Cho Oyu
 2003 - Gasherbrum II
 2006 - Makalu

See also
List of 20th-century summiters of Mount Everest
List of Mount Everest records

References

External links
 Anna Czerwinska the famous Polish climber

1949 births
2023 deaths
Female climbers
Polish mountain climbers
Polish women writers
Summiters of the Seven Summits
Polish summiters of Mount Everest
Sportspeople from Warsaw